The Bonneville County Courthouse is a historic building in Idaho Falls, Idaho, and the courthouse of Bonneville County, Idaho. It was built in 1921 with reinforced concrete, sandstone from Boise, and there is a marble staircase inside. The entrance includes "an entablature supported by Corinthian pilasters" and "a round arch with garlanded spandrels". It was designed by architects Lionel E. Fisher and Charles Aitken. It has been listed on the National Register of Historic Places since July 10, 1979.

References

		
National Register of Historic Places in Bonneville County, Idaho
Government buildings completed in 1921